This is a list of members of the Flemish Parliament between 1999 and 2004, following the direct elections of 1999.

Results

By party

Agalev (1999–2003) → Groen! (2003–2004)

Changes during the legislature

Representatives who resigned

References

Politics of Flanders
1999 in Belgium
2000s in Belgium